The House Of Wisdom For Conflict Resolution & Governance (HOW) is a think-tank that was created in May 2008. The Secretary-General of HOW is Dr. Ahmed Yousef, a leading Hamas official who was a former Political Advisor to Gaza Prime Minister Ismail Haniyeh and currently Deputy in the Ministry of Foreign Affairs. Dr. Youssef says HOW is playing a role in and sponsoring the Palestinian reconciliation process between Hamas and the Palestinian Authority.

HOW officials have testified on the Gaza–Israel conflict before the Foreign Relations Committee of the UK Parliament as well as having sponsored various delegations, conferences, seminars, and workshops. In February 2013, HOW received a Parliamentary delegation from the UK consisting of 11 parliamentarians and headed by MP Philipe Hollobone and Dr Ibrahim Hewitt, the head of Interpal, a UK charity that although designated in 2003 by the US as a terrorist organization that funds Hamas, operates legally within the United Kingdom

Speaking as a HOW leader, Dr. Youssef has said that the Gaza Strip smuggling tunnels "are our technology, our only weapon of war, no different from tanks or drones" and that Hamas is a Muslim Brotherhood group" with "moderate ideology and principles,."

References

Organizations established in 2008
Think tanks based in the State of Palestine
Hamas